The Mazda RX-8 Hydrogen RE is a 2003 bi-fuel version of the RX-8 sports car, in which the twin-rotor wankel rotary engine is configured to run on either hydrogen or gasoline. This is the fifth Mazda vehicle to be fitted with a hydrogen wankel rotary engine.

Specifications 

The hydrogen tank is made of aluminum and carbon fibre and has a capacity of 110 liters at 350 bar stores up to 2.4 kilograms of hydrogen and is fitted in addition to the 61 liter gasoline tank. The car can be switched from gasoline to hydrogen mode using a button in the cabin. The Hydrogen tank takes up most of the RX-8s trunk space and all the hydrogen components weigh in at 187 lbs in total. Running in hydrogen mode, it produces no emissions other than water vapour and has a range of around 100 km (62 mi). In 2005, Mazda obtained street approval for this vehicle. The following year, the first vehicles were leased to customers in Idemitsu and Iwatani at a price of 420,000 JPY per month. In November 2007, Mazda announced the delivery of 30 RX-8 HRE to the Norwegian hydrogen project Hynor.

The bivalent RENESIS wankel rotary engine has the following data:

See also
Premacy Hydrogen RE Hybrid
List of hydrogen internal combustion engine vehicles

References

External links
RX-8 HRE webpage

RX-8 Hydrogen RE
Sports cars
Hydrogen cars
Rear-wheel-drive vehicles
Cars powered by Wankel engines
Cars introduced in 2003